Wintershill is a hamlet in south Hampshire, England.

References

Villages in Hampshire